The  is a Japanese railway line operated by the private railway operator Matsuura Railway, which connects Arita in Saga Prefecture with Sasebo in Nagasaki Prefecture. This is the westernmost railway line in Japan, with Tabira-Hiradoguchi Station being the westernmost station.

History

The line was extended to Imabuku in 1930, Matsuura in 1933, Tabira-Hiradoguchi in 1935, and Senryūgataki in 1939.

In 1931, it was extended to Saza, with the company acquiring the Kansai Coal line to Sechibaru in 1933 and passenger services to Yoshii commencing in 1934. A connection to Sasebo opened in 1935, and the company was nationalised in October 1936.

From 1 April 1988, the line between Arita and Sasebo was transferred from JNR operation to the privately owned Matsuura Railway.

Former connecting lines
 Yoshii Station: The  Sechibaru line to Sechibaru, opened by the Kansai Coal Mining Co. as a  gauge line in 1896, was nationalised and regauged at the same time as the main line, and closed in 1971.
 Saza Station: The  line to Usunoura was opened by the Sasebo Light Railway for coal transportation in 1931. It was also nationalised and regauged at the same time as the main line, and closed in 1971.
 Hidariishi Station: The  Yunoki line to 'Upper' Sasebo opened in 1921 as a  gauge line, became a branch with the opening of the direct line to Sasebo in 1935, was regauged in 1943 and remained in service until flood damage closed it in 1967.
 Sasebo station - A  line to a US Forces Japan oil storage facility operated between 1950 and 1978.

Stations
●: Stops   |: Does not stop
Rapid Service: Down trains (to Sasebo) operate between Saza and Sasebo. Up trains (from Sasebo) operate between Sasebo and Tabira-Hiradoguchi.

See also
List of railway lines in Japan

References
This article incorporates material from the corresponding article in the Japanese Wikipedia

External links 
  

Rail transport in Saga Prefecture
Rail transport in Nagasaki Prefecture
1067 mm gauge railways in Japan
Railway lines opened in 1898
Japanese third-sector railway lines